is a hilltop castle, now largely ruins, built by Hōjō Sōun in the Izu Province in 1493.

Originally, Sōun had his main castle at Kōkokuji Castle. After building Nirayama Castle, Sōun made it his main castle and kept on living in the castle to his death in 1519.

The castle was well fortified, with western style fortifications, and had supporting forts on four nearby hills.  Garrisoned with 3600 men, it withstood a siege against it by 40,000 troops under the command of Oda Nobukatsu for 3 months, with the defenders only giving up when the main castle for the clan was lost.

After the surrender, Tokugawa Ieyasu's retainer Naito Nobunari moved into the castle, respectively holding 10,000 koku to its name. He however, then left it in 1601, at which time it became abandoned.

Current
The castle is now only ruins with some earthen walls and water moats.

Access
About 10 minutes walk from Nirayama Station.

References 

Castles in Shizuoka Prefecture
Buildings and structures completed in 1493
Former castles in Japan
Ruined castles in Japan
Go-Hōjō clan
1490s establishments in Japan